Três Dias Sem Deus is a 1945 Portuguese drama film directed by Bárbara Virgínia. It was entered into the 1946 Cannes Film Festival.

Cast
 Maria Clementina as Teresa, the castle's maid
 Laura Fernandes as Beatriz, the school's maid
 Jorge Gentil as Alberto, the priest
 Rosa Linda as Isabel Belforte
 Manuel Mariano as Ill boy
 Joaquim Miranda as Tadeu, the cart-driver
 João Perry as Paulo Belforte
 Casimiro Rodrigues as Januário
 Alfredo Ruas as Lídia's father
 António Sacramento as Village's doctor
 Elvira Velez as Bernarda, the village's witch
 Bárbara Virgínia as Lídia

References

External links

1945 films
1940s Portuguese-language films
1945 drama films
Portuguese black-and-white films
Portuguese drama films